Jun-chung "Kevin" Huang (born 25 April 1982) is a Taiwanese former professional baseball player who competed in the 2004 Summer Olympics.

References

1982 births
Living people
Augusta GreenJackets players
Baseball pitchers
Baseball players at the 2004 Summer Olympics
Gulf Coast Red Sox players
Lowell Spinners players
Olympic baseball players of Taiwan
People from Pingtung County
Sarasota Red Sox players
Taiwanese expatriate baseball players in the United States
2006 World Baseball Classic players
La New Bears players